Myslym 'Lym' Alla (15 April 1919 – 1 January 1999) was an Albanian football player and manager who played for SK Tirana and went on to manage 17 Nëntori and Partizani Tirana.

References

1919 births
1999 deaths
Footballers from Tirana
Albanian footballers
Association footballers not categorized by position
KF Tirana players
Kategoria Superiore players
Albania national football team managers
FK Partizani Tirana managers
KF Tirana managers
Albanian football managers